William Clyde Thompson (1839–1912) was a Texas Choctaw-Chickasaw leader of the Mount Tabor Indian Community in Texas and an officer of the Confederate States of America during the Civil War. After moving north to the Chickasaw Nation in 1889, he led an effort to gain enrollment of his family and other Texas Choctaws as Citizens by blood of the Choctaw Nation in Indian Territory. This was at the time of enrollment for the Final Roll of the Five Civilized Tribes, also known as the Dawes Rolls, which established citizenship in order for the nations to be broken up for white settlement and to allot communal tribal lands to individual Indians. The Choctaw Advisory Board opposed inclusion of the Texas Choctaw as well as the Jena Choctaws in Louisiana, as they had both lived primarily outside of the Choctaw Nation. Thompson's case eventually went to the United States Supreme Court to be decided where he and about 70 other Texas Choctaws who had relocated to Indian Territory ultimately had their status restored as Citizens by Blood in the Choctaw Nation.

Born in 1839 near Fort Towson in the Choctaw Nation, Thompson was an infant when his family moved to what was then Mexican Texas. They returned to the Choctaw Nation in 1840 after an attack on their village on Attoyac Bayou in what is now Rusk County, Texas. Soon afterwards both of his parents died, leaving him and a brother Arthur to live with their elderly grandmother Margaret McCoy-Thompson near Fort Washita, before being sent back to Mississippi, where they were raised by their maternal grandparents. The brothers entered the Confederate Army there when the Civil War broke out.

After the Civil War, Thompson initially returned to Texas and re-established connections with extended family among the Mount Tabor Indian Community. He married and started a family there. They moved north to Indian Territory in 1889, settling at Marlow in the Chickasaw Nation.

Background
William C. Thompson was born on February 6, 1839, into a mixed-race family who identified primarily as Choctaw and Chickasaw but also had European-American ancestry. He was born at Fort Towson on the southern border of Choctaw Nation, several years after the people were removed there. His father was William Thompson, who was one-fourth Choctaw and Chickasaw, the son of Henry Thompson, a white man, and Margaret McCoy a three-fourths Choctaw and Chickasaw Indian. Margaret being the daughter of Atahobia a full blood Choctaw and Sally McCoy a half blood Chickasaw of the Bird Clan. His mother was Elizabeth Jones Mangum, who was one-eighth Choctaw and the granddaughter of Nashoba (also known as Samuel Jones) a half-blood Choctaw, the son of Simon P. Jones a Welshman and his Choctaw wife Tuskanoga. His family were Yowani Choctaw, named for their village of Yowani east of the Chickasawhay River in what is now eastern Mississippi. The town of present-day Shubuta, Clarke County, Mississippi, developed nearby, first as a trading post.

Many Yowani had earlier moved away from European Americans and west into Louisiana and Texas, taking on the customs of their neighbors. Early anthropologist James Mooney had classified the Yowani as one of the divisions of the Caddo Confederacy. Other Yowani joined the Koasati or Coushatta, former tribes within the Creek Confederacy. In the Treaty of Bowles Village between the tribes and the Republic of Texas, concluded on February 23, 1836, the Yowani Choctaw were listed with the Cherokee and Twelve Associated Tribes.

William was descended through his paternal grandmother Margaret McCoy from Atahobia (c.1750–c.1824) a full-blood Choctaw and his Chickasaw wife Sally McCoy. The Choctaw and Chickasaw were among the Native American tribes that had matrilineal kinship systems, and children were considered born to the mother's family for social status, inheritance and descent. Atahobia had four children with Sally McCoy of which three, James, William and Margaret lived to adulthood. Sally was a half-blood Chickasaw. Later she married another half-blood Chickasaw named Harry Frazier of which she had two children with, Polly and Dickson Frazier. Her third marriage was to Chickasaw leader Major James Colbert (1768–1842) of which she had one daughter Jinsy Colbert. Atahobia was one of the leaders of the Yowani who moved into Texas from Louisiana in 1824 after petitioning the Mexican government for permission to settle in the province. Prior to this, Atahobia was a signatory of the Treaty of Doak's Stand in 1820, as one of the Chiefs and Headmen of the Choctaw who ceded land in Mississippi to the United States.

In Texas the villages prior to 1837 were located east of the Trinity River in what was then Nacogdoches County, west of the U.S. (Louisiana) border on both the Patroon and Attoyac Bayou's. After 1837 the villages were combined to form a single village on Attoyac Bayou in extreme southeastern Rusk County. Thompson's family had regularly traveled between the Choctaw Nation and the Texas Choctaw villages, where they were living in 1840. That year white vigilantes attacked the Choctaw village. They were seeking retaliation against Indians, believed to be Cherokees, who had earlier killed three white men near Nacogdoches. Not being able to catch the so-called "offending" Indians, they fell upon the closest Indian village they could find. Although the Yowani having nothing to do with nor knowledge of the violence about to befall them. They vigilantes murdered eleven Choctaw men, women and children soothing their need for vengeance.

According to Dr. Irv May (Texas A & M University-College Station) and information from the Thompson-McCoy Choctaw-Chickasaw Descendants Association, William's family survived the attack on the village, and quickly fled back to the Choctaw Nation. William's mother and infant sister died there on August 30, 1840, followed two days later by his father. Family speculation and the timing suggests they may have been mortally wounded in the Texians' attack, but may also have died of infectious disease, as smallpox epidemics had swept Texas and Indian Territory.

After being orphaned, William and his older brother Arthur James Thompson (1837–1884) were to live with their paternal grandmother Margaret (McCoy) Thompson (c.1774–c.1868), then living in Chickasaw Nation near Fort Washita. She had been married by Choctaw custom to Henry Thompson, a white man, and lived with him while in Mississippi, having three sons with him before removal of the Choctaw to Indian Territory. By the time of the forced removal she was living near her brother James A. McCoy in the Chickasaw Nation-East in what is now Pontotoc County, Mississippi. James McCoy would later go on to serve as the Supreme Judge of the Chickasaw Nation. In the 1840s she lived near Fort Washita in the Chickasaw Nation at a community then known as Virginia Hill, presumably near her half-brother Dickson Frazier. The boys lived with her until their maternal grandfather William Mangum came to take them back to Mississippi, where they lived with him and his family until coming of age and serving in the American Civil War.

American Civil War
As the Civil War broke out, both William and his brother Arthur enlisted in the Simpson Fencibles as privates (Simpson County, Mississippi). He fought in the battle of Shiloh, where he was wounded while charging Union fortifications. He was back with his unit within two days and was elected as captain of his company.

His next injury was more serious: his skull was fractured by shrapnel in a fight at Fort Gibson, Cherokee Nation in May 1863. He was hospitalized for some time before he could resume his command. He later saw action in the Atlanta campaign. During this period at a place called Peach Tree Creek, his company (H of the Mississippi 20th Regiment) were being detailed in support of Cowman's battery, when they encountered a regiment of Union troops. They charged the federals with fixed bayonets, eventually capturing some forty-seven. During the Atlanta campaign, Thompson saw action several times before he accompanied General Hood back to Tennessee. There, at the Battle of Franklin he was shot in the thigh and captured by the federals.

He was taken to a Union prison hospital in Nashville, where he was treated for his wounds. He was held as a prisoner for the duration of the war. While a prisoner, Thompson was promoted by the Confederate government to the rank of brevet Lieutenant Colonel of a Mississippi regiment. It formed following the consolidation of the 6th and 20th Mississippi regiments. Thompson never used the latter title, but preferred to be called "Captain" to the day he died.

From Nashville, Thompson was sent to Camp Chase, Ohio, then to Baltimore, Maryland, and finally by steamboat to Richmond, Virginia, in a prisoner exchange of officers. He was paroled by Union officials a short time before the close of the war. He returned to Simpson County, Mississippi, on June 1, 1865, and began preparations to return to his extended family in Texas.

He reached Dallas County, Texas, in December 1865, later living in Cherokee County and Smith County, just south of present-day Troup, Texas. With the opening a new lumber mill by his distant cousin John Martin Thompson, William moved with other maternal family members to the newly organized Trinity County, living at Centralia. While he was living in Smith County he was near many of his cousins, both Choctaw and Cherokee. Thompson became involved in efforts to preserve the culture and lands that had been included in the Treaty of Bowles Village in 1836. His paternal uncle Archibald Thompson (1791–1857) had settled there in 1851 and had become a leader among the Texas Choctaw. Following Archibald's death in 1857, John Thurston Thompson Sr. (1829–1864) became leader; he was a cousin of William's, the son of his uncle Archibald.

William Thompson's intelligence and leadership experience was valued not ony by the Texas Choctaws and related Chickasaws but the Cherokees and the neighboring McIntosh Party Creek Indians as well. He had an excellent reputation among local Indians and non-Indians alike. But he was less successful as a businessman, having difficulty saying no to people in need.

The Mount Tabor Indian Community, later known as the Texas Cherokees and Associate Bands, was led by John Adair "Jack" Bell (1806–1860) who along with his brother Devereaux Jarrett Bell (known by his Indian name of Chicken Trotter) and members`of the Starr, Harnage, Watie and other prominent Cherokee families. (Note: The Texas Cherokees Cherokees and Associate Bands were officially formed as a political organization in 1853 by Colonel William Penn Adair who along with Clement Neely Vann, reorganized the organization in 1871 after the war and the death of Stand Watie. Both Cherokee who were former Mount Tabor Indian Community residents. After all it had always been a Cherokee community, but the Yowani connections to the Bell, Adair and Thompson Cherokee families, made it the safest place in Texas for Indians to live following the blood baths of the early 1840s. Additionally following the war and his return to Texas, William took another step that would change his life forever.

Marriage and family
On May 29, 1867, Thompson married Sarah S. Estes, the daughter of Thomas Coleman Estes (b. 1811) and the former Elizabeth Darby (c.1815-c.1853). They had three children: Arthur M. (1869–1926); Mary M. (b. 1862), who married William McNeece; and William Clyde Thompson, Jr. (1875–1921). The Estes family was European American, of predominately English ancestry.

Changes in Texas Choctaw communities
By 1844, following the Treaty of Birds Fort, there were two villages, one near the Cherokee band under the leadership of Chicken Trotter (Devireaux Jarrett Bell, 1817–1866), in what would become the Mt. Tabor/Bellview Indian communities in Rusk County; and the second under the leadership of Woody Jones (grandson of Nashoba), located in Houston County near the border with Trinity County.

Thompson followed work opportunities, moving to Trinity County. The Indian village had dwindled there as people moved away for work. John Martin Thompson (1829–1907) a distant Cherokee cousin, the son of Benjamin Franklin Thompson (1803–1868) and his Cherokee wife Annie Martin (1810–1851), established new lumber mills in this and Angelina County beginning about 1881, near Woodlake and Diboll. These generated more revenue and added to the economy. He attracted numerous Choctaw, Cherokee (Thompson's & Starr's), and Muscogee-Creek (Berryhill's & Posey's) into the area. William Thompson was elected as the second probate clerk of the county, and later to the office of probate judge.

Return to Indian Territory
In 1889 William Thompson left Texas for good, relocating with his family first to Ardmore in the Chickasaw Nation. They later moved to the new community of Marlow, where he would live and work for the rest of his life.

Several relatives followed him north into the Chickasaw Nation. Among these were John Thurston Thompson Jr. (1864–1907), Martin Luther Thompson (1857–1946) and Robert E. Lee Thompson (1872–1959). William and John were elected by family members who had relocated into the Chickasaw and Choctaw Nations as their formal representatives.

Martin Thompson and Robert Thompson stayed for a short period, but returned to Texas. Oil was discovered on Martin's land in Texas, making him a wealthy man worth more than $200,000 at the time of his death. Martin became a leader among the Choctaw-Chickasaws in Texas, while keeping close to his Cherokee relatives. Martin Thompson went on to continue that leadership role until his death in 1946. For John Thompson Jr., his passing in 1907 just before the closing of the Final Rolls, meant the work became William C. Thompson only. It was a work that would last the majority of his life.

While living in the Chickasaw Nation, William Thompson worked tirelessly to have his family members enrolled as citizens by blood in the Choctaw Nation, where he had been born. He wanted to be counted as a citizen to participate in the allotments of Choctaw communal lands that was to be conducted under the Dawes Act, to extinguish Indian claims in preparation for Oklahoma statehood. He also wanted to ensure that his family were recognized as Choctaw Indians as their birthright. The case went back and forth for years, as the Choctaw Advisory Board opposed inclusion of Mount Tabor band members in Texas or Jena Choctaws from Louisiana who were separated from the nation for an extended period of time. The names of Thompson and his family, and all the Texas Choctaws, were stricken from the Dawes Roll in March 1906.

In February 1909 Thompson and some seventy Texas Choctaw who were living in Oklahoma were restored to citizenship in the Choctaw Nation and included in a Department of Interior reinstatement list. Those who had returned to Texas were not included.

Thompson's persistence was recognized in other ways. In 1901 he was elected Mayor of Marlow, Chickasaw Nation, I. T. (now Oklahoma). He was the most celebrated leader among the Texas Choctaws in IT as he helped many, many of his family and descendants become re-established in the western Chickasaw Nation.

See also

 Charles Collins Thompson
 Martin Luther Thompson
 Mount Tabor Indian Community
 Mount Tabor Indian Community
 John Martin Thompson
 Mount Tabor Indian Cemetery
 Treaty of Bowles Village
 Yowani Choctaws

Notes

References

Sources
  William C. Thompson, et al. vs. Choctaw Nation, MCR File 341, Bureau of Indian Affairs, Muskogee, Oklahoma
  United States Department of the Interior, Secretary of the Interior-Choctaw Citizenship Cases, #4 William C. Thompson et al., pgs 151-157
  D.C. Gideon, Indian Territory...1901, pg. 534
  William C. Thompson and the Choctaw-Chickasaw Paper Chase by Dr. Douglas Hale, Oklahoma State University
  1896 Choctaw Census; Choctaws Residing in the Chickasaw Nation, Pickens County, IT
  Department of the Interior, Office of Indian Affairs correspondence between A.C. Tonner, Acting Commissioner for the Dawes Commission, and the Secretary of the Interior, April 29, 1904; ref. Land 25846-1904-Oklahoma Historical Society
  Choctaw Re-instatement list, Correspondence from the Department of the Interior to the Commissioner of the Five Civilized Tribes, February 20, 1909
  John S. Spring et al. vs. Choctaw Nation, Bureau of Indian Affairs, Muskogee, Oklahoma
  A History of the State of Oklahoma, 1908, by Luther Hill, pgs 239-241 http://www.usgennet.org/usa/topic/historical/1908ok_2_25.htm
  1818 Partial Chickasaw annuity roll, listing Sally McCoy #22; K.M. Armstrong
  The Beech Island Historical Society, 144 Old Jackson Highway, P. O Box 158, Beech Island, SC 29842
  Cecil Lee Pinkston-Vinson interview with her grandfather Martin L. Thompson on March 14, 1934
  Letter of J.N. Waton to L. Draper, 25 JUN 1882
  Republic of Texas Treaties; Treaty of Bowles Village February 23, 1836, Texas State Historical Society, Austin, Texas
  Treaty of Birds Fort September 29, 1843, Texas State Historical Society, Austin, Texas
  United States-Choctaw Treaties: Treaty of Doaks Stand October 18, 1820, National Archives, Fort Worth, Texas
  Starr's History of the Cherokee Indians, by Dr. Emmet Starr
  The 1840 Census of the Republic of Texas, 1966 Pemberton Press, Austin, Texas, Edited by Gifford White, Nacogdoches County
  Texas Indian Papers 1835-1845, Texas State Archives, Austin, Texas
  Cecil Lee Pinkston-Vinson interviews (verification of Chicken Trotter as the Indian name of Devireaux Jarett Bell) with Daisy Starr, Kilgore, Texas, August 22, 1967, Mack Starr September 14, 1967, and George M. Bell Sr. September 17, 1967. Summer of 1963 survey of memorial markers of Mount Tabor Indian Cemetery (Rusk County, Texas) by Roy and Cecil Vinson. Headstone of Jarrett Bell showed the name "Chief Chicken Trotter" at the bottom of stone. Note: stone was gone in 1967 survey and is noted as gone by George Morrison Bell Sr. in 1969 in his book Genealogy of Old and New Cherokee Families
  Debts due the United States from the Choctaw Trading House, October 1, 1822
  Frederick Webb Hodge, ed., Handbook of American Indians North of Mexico (2 vols., Washington: GPO, 1907, 1910, rpt., New York: Pageant, 1959)
  A History of the Caddo Indians by William B. Glover, The Louisiana Historical Quarterly, Vol. 18, No. 4. October, 1935
  The Old Mount Tabor Community, Genealogy of Old and New Cherokee Families, by George Morrison Bell Sr.
  George Fields Collection, Gilcrease Museum, Tulsa, Oklahoma
  Papers of W.W. Keeler relating to the Texas Cherokees, Cherokee National Historical Society, Tahlequah, Oklahoma
  Some East Texas Native Families: Texas Cherokees and Associate Bands Genealogy Project: Rootsweb Global Search: Familyties http://wc.rootsweb.ancestry.com/cgi-bin/igm.cgi?db=familyties
  Texas by Terán By  Manuel de Mier y Teran, Jack Jackson, John Wheat, Scooter Cheatham, Lynn Marshall
  Handbook of Texas Online: John Martin Thompson https://tshaonline.org/handbook/online/articles/fth43 (accessed September 3, 2008)
  Handbook of Texas Online: Indians; Republics of Texas and Mexico, https://tshaonline.org/handbook/online/articles/bzi04 (accessed September 3, 2008)
 Handbook of Texas Online: Mount Tabor Indian Community, https://tshaonline.org/handbook/online/articles/bmm45 (accessed February 7, 2018)
  Oklahoma Historical Society, Records of the Department of the Interior, Laws, Decisions and Regulations Affecting the work of the Commissioner to the Five Civilized Tribes 1893-1906, pgs 130-138
  North Georgia Creek History, Culture and Society of the Creek Indians, Information related to the McIntosh Party of the Creek Nation, by Larry Worthy http://ngeorgia.com/history/creekhistory.html
  Letter of April 4, 1905, from Thomas Ryan, First Assistant Secretary Indian Affairs to Commissioner to the Five Civilized Tribes, Muskogee, Indian Territory, re: Willian C. Thompson et al. MCR 341, MCR 7124, MCR 581 and MCR 458.
  The Dawes Commission and the Allotment of the Five Civilized Tribes, 1893-1914 by Kent Carter, Ancestry Publishing 1999, 13:978-0916489854
  Handbook of American Indians North of Mexico by Frederick Webb Hodge, Smithsonian Institution American Ethnology, Washington, D. C.: Government Printing Office, 1907, pgs 1001-1002, ; 13:978-0313212819
  Chief Bowles and Texas Cherokees, Chapter XI, Cherokee Claims to Land, By Mary Whatley Clarke, University of Oklahoma Press,

External links
Book Search, Handbook of American Indians North of Mexico By Frederick Webb Hodge
A History of the Caddo Indians By: WILLIAM B. GLOVER
Thompson Cemetery, Rusk County, Texas; Information related to Cherokee descendants buried there, by Paul Ridenour, 2005
Mount Tabor Indian Cemetery, Rusk County, Texas
Mount Tabor Indian Cemetery, Rusk County, Texas
 Asbury Cemetery, Smith County, Texas, Information related to Choctaw and Cherokee descendants buried there, by Paul Ridenour, 2005
The Handbook of Texas Online: Yowani Indians, Margery H. Krieger
The Handbook of Texas Online: Indians by George Klos
Mt. Tabor Cemetery, Rusk County TxGenWeb
 A Starr Studded Event, April 9, 2005 by Paul Ridenour
 The George Harlan Starr and Nancy (Bell) Starr Home, Located near Leveretts Chapel, Texas (Mt. Tabor Indian Community), by Paul Ridenour 2005
Ridenour's Major Ridge Home Page, by Paul Ridenour 2008
Family Ties Genealogy Index, East Texas Native American family information
The Thompson Choctaw Indians Photo Gallery, Thompson Choctaw Indian Descendants Association 2001
Mt. Tabor Indian Community Ancestral Roll, Sponsored by the Thompson-Choctaw Indian Descendants Association 2001
Choctaw Nation Genealogical Information
CHOCTAW HISTORY, STORIES AND INFO
Museum of the Red River-The Choctaw
Handbook of Texas Online: Mount Tabor Indian Community by J.C. Thompson and Patrick Pynes

1839 births
1912 deaths
Native American leaders
Choctaw people
People of Mexican Texas
People from Choctaw County, Oklahoma
20th-century Native Americans
19th-century Native Americans